Margination may refer to:
 a sign in leukocyte extravasation
 Marginate conch (Margistrombus marginatus), a sea snail species found in the Andaman Sea
 Marginated damsel (Dascyllus marginatus), a fish species found in the Western Indian Ocean
 Marginated tortoise (Testudo marginata''), a tortoise species found in Greece, Italy and the Balkans

See also